The Luarica diamond mine is a diamond mine located in Angola. The mine is owned by a consortium of diamond mining companies, the two largest holders being Endiama with 38 percent ownership and Trans Hex with 32 percent ownership.

In 2004, the Luarica mine produced about 95,000 carats (19 kg) of diamond from over 632,000 cubic meters of ore processed. 84,000 carats (16.8 kg) of the production was sold in 2004, at an average price of over US$300 per carat (1500 $/g), a new high mark for Angolan diamond production.

There is a waste rock overburden of about 9.5 million cubic meters.

Mining operations were suspended in May 2009 due to a decline in diamond demand caused by the late-2000s financial crisis. Trans Hex announced in August 2011 that it planned to withdraw from its two Angola joint-ventures with Endiama—Luarica and Fucauma—after failing to reach an agreement with the government of Angola (which owns the other major partner, Endiama). Endiama stated that it planned to restart operations alone.

References

Trans Hex 2004 Annual Report
 Projecto Luarica at Endiama's site
Republic of Angola, United Kingdom Embassy (October 2002). "Newsletter No. 85".

Diamond mines in Angola
Surface mines in Angola